Mickey's Birthday Party is a 1942 American animated short film directed by Riley Thomson, produced by Walt Disney Productions and distributed by RKO Radio Pictures. The 114th short to feature Mickey Mouse, it was released on February 7, 1942. The animated film was directed by Riley Thomson and animated by Les Clark, James Moore, Ken Muse, Armin Shaffair, Riley Thompson, Bernie Wolf, and Marvin Woodward. It was the 116th short in the Mickey Mouse film series to be released, and the first for that year.

Plot
Minnie Mouse, Donald Duck, Goofy, Clarabelle Cow, Horace Horsecollar, and Clara Cluck throw a big party for Mickey. He is given a music player as a gift, and he dances a wild rhumba while Minnie plays. Meanwhile, Goofy tries baking a cake, but keeps messing it up. When Minnie comes in to check on his progress, Goofy covers his tracks and tells her that the bake is going fine.  Meanwhile, Donald, dressed in a sombrero, dances with Clara, whose wild, exuberant dancing exhaust Donald. In the end, Goofy buys a cake from the bakery. Clara in her exuberance, shakes the tired Donald so much, she flings him out of his shirt. When Clara looks up, a sweaty and exhausted Donald is seen hanging on the chandelier. Goofy accidentally throws the cake on Mickey as everyone sings "Happy Birthday to You", but Mickey smiles regardless.

Production

This short is an update of the 1931 black and white short The Birthday Party. The 1931 version only had Mickey, Minnie, Clarabelle and Horace, since none of the other characters existed at the time.

It also has some marks of 1932's The Whoopee Party.

Some of the animation of Mickey's wild dance was actually originally done by Ward Kimball for The Reluctant Dragon, not only used in the film.

Voice cast
 Mickey Mouse: Walt Disney
 Minnie Mouse: Thelma Boardman
 Goofy: Pinto Colvig
 Donald Duck: Clarence Nash
 Clara Cluck: Florence Gill
 Clarabelle Cow: Elvia Allman

Home media
The short was released on May 18, 2004, on Walt Disney Treasures: Mickey Mouse in Living Color, Volume Two: 1939-Today.

See also
Mickey Mouse (film series)

References

External links

 

1942 films
1942 animated films
1940s Disney animated short films
Mickey Mouse short films
Donald Duck short films
Films about birthdays
Films directed by Riley Thomson
Films produced by Walt Disney
Disney film remakes
Short film remakes